Kali Alaudeen (born 13 January 1984) is a former Indian football player and is the current head coach of Chennaiyin B, the reserve side of Chennaiyin of the Indian Super League.

Playing career
Born in Kayalpatnam, Tamil Nadu, Alaudeen spent the majority of his playing career in Mumbai, playing for Mahindra United, Air India, Mumbai Tigers, and Mumbai. He also spent a season with Salgaocar in Goa.

On 25 January 2015, Alaudeen played in his final I-League match against Shillong Lajong. He started but could not prevent Mumbai from losing 0–1.

In February 2016, Alaudeen was named captain of the Tamil Nadu side that participated in the 2015–16 Santosh Trophy. He led his side to the semi-finals, where they were defeated by Maharashtra 0–1.

Coaching career
After retiring from his playing career, Alaudeen was named the assistant coach of Tamil Nadu for their 2018–19 Santosh Trophy campaign. A few months later, he was appointed as the head coach of Chennaiyin B.

Managerial statistics
.

References

External links
 Soccerway Profile.

1984 births
Living people
People from Tamil Nadu
Mahindra United FC players
Salgaocar FC players
Air India FC players
Mumbai Tigers FC players
Mumbai FC players
Association football defenders
I-League players
I-League 2nd Division players
Santosh Trophy players
Indian footballers
Footballers from Tamil Nadu
Indian football managers